In mathematics, an anti-diagonal matrix is a square matrix where all the entries are zero except those on the diagonal going from the lower left corner to the upper right corner (↗), known as the anti-diagonal (sometimes Harrison diagonal, secondary diagonal, trailing diagonal, minor diagonal, or bad diagonal).

Formal definition
An n-by-n matrix A is an anti-diagonal matrix if the (i, j) element is zero

Example
An example of an anti-diagonal matrix is

Properties
All anti-diagonal matrices are also persymmetric.

The product of two anti-diagonal matrices is a diagonal matrix. Furthermore, the product of an anti-diagonal matrix with a diagonal matrix is anti-diagonal, as is the product of a diagonal matrix with an anti-diagonal matrix.

An anti-diagonal matrix is invertible if and only if the entries on the diagonal from the lower left corner to the upper right corner are nonzero. The inverse of any invertible anti-diagonal matrix is also anti-diagonal, as can be seen from the paragraph above. The determinant of an anti-diagonal matrix has absolute value given by the product of the entries on the diagonal from the lower left corner to the upper right corner. However, the sign of this determinant will vary because the one nonzero signed elementary product from an anti-diagonal matrix will have a different sign depending on whether the permutation related to it is odd or even:

More precisely, the sign of the elementary product needed to calculate the determinant of an anti-diagonal matrix is related to whether the corresponding triangular number is even or odd. This is because the number of inversions in the permutation for the only nonzero signed elementary product of any n × n anti-diagonal matrix is always equal to the nth such number.

See also 
 Main diagonal, all off-diagonal elements are zero in a diagonal matrix.
 Exchange matrix, an anti-diagonal matrix with 1s along the counter-diagonal.

External links
 
 Matrix calculator

Sparse matrices
Matrices